Villerest is a commune in the Loire department in central France. It is a Medieval-era commune located just south of the city of Roanne. The village is bordered by the river Loire.

Population

Sights
Le Barrage de Villerest, a hydroelectric dam that also prevents flooding along the Loire.  This dam also creates a reservoir, the Lac de Villerest.
The village itself contains many buildings from the Middle Ages.  These include numerous houses, and the Eglise de Saint-Priest.  Maybe most famous from this time period are the ramparts that are still mostly intact today.

International relations

Villerest is twinned with:
  Piatra Neamţ, Romania and Storrington, West Sussex, England.

See also
Communes of the Loire department

References

Communes of Loire (department)